Brett Austin Baty (born November 13, 1999) is an American professional baseball third baseman for the New York Mets of Major League Baseball (MLB). The Mets selected Baty in the first round of the 2019 MLB draft. He made his MLB debut in 2022.

Amateur career
Baty attended Lake Travis High School in Austin, Texas, where he played basketball, baseball, and football. As a senior, he hit .615 with 19 home runs and 50 RBIs. He was named the Gatorade Texas Baseball Player of the Year. He committed to play college baseball at the University of Texas.

Professional career
Baty was selected by the New York Mets in the first round (12th overall) of the 2019 Major League Baseball draft. He signed for $3.9 million and was assigned to the Gulf Coast League Mets. After five games, he was promoted to the Kingsport Mets before being promoted to the Brooklyn Cyclones. Over 51 games between the three teams, he batted .234/.368/.452 with seven home runs and 33 RBIs.

Baty returned to Brooklyn to begin 2021. In June, Baty was selected to play in the All-Star Futures Game. Following the game, he was promoted to the Binghamton Rumble Ponies. Over 91 games between the two teams, he slashed .292/.382/.473 with 12 home runs, 56 RBIs, and 22 doubles. Baty began the 2022 season with Binghamton, and was promoted to the Syracuse Mets in August. 

Following injuries to Eduardo Escobar and Luis Guillorme, Baty was called up to the major leagues on August 17, 2022. He hit a home run in his first major league at-baton a curveball from Jake Odorizzi. He became only the fifth Mets player to homer in his first career MLB at bat. Baty ended up going 1-for-4 with two RBIs, including a 113 mph groundout that was the hardest hit ball by a Mets left-handed hitter off a lefty pitcher since 2016.

References

External links

1999 births
Living people
Baseball players from Texas
Binghamton Rumble Ponies players
Brooklyn Cyclones players
Gulf Coast Mets players
Kingsport Mets players
Major League Baseball third basemen
New York Mets players
People from Round Rock, Texas
Salt River Rafters players
Syracuse Mets players